The name Clara has been used for twelve tropical cyclones worldwide. 

Atlantic Ocean:

Hurricane Clara (1977)

Eastern Pacific Ocean: 

Tropical Storm Clara (1959)

Western Pacific Ocean:

Typhoon Clara (1950) (T5017)

Typhoon Clara (1955) (T5505, 07W)

Typhoon Clara (1961) (T6126, 63W)

Typhoon Clara (1964) (T6427, 35W, Dorang)

Typhoon Clara (1967) (T6708, 08W, Ising)

Typhoon Clara (1970) (T7012, 13W) 

Tropical Storm Clara (1973) (T7303, 03W)

Tropical Storm Clara (1976) (T7614, 14W)

Typhoon Clara (1981) (T8120, 24W, Rubing)

Tropical Storm Clara (1988) (T8810, 10W)

Atlantic hurricane set index articles
Pacific hurricane set index articles
Pacific typhoon set index articles